Nicholas Barnewall may refer to:

Nicholas Barnewall (Irish judge) (died after 1465), Lord Chief Justice of Ireland
Nicholas Barnewall, 1st Viscount Barnewall (1592–1663), Irish landowner and politician
Nicholas Barnewall, 3rd Viscount Barnewall (1668–1725), Irish nobleman
Nicholas Barnewall, 14th Baron Trimlestown (1726–1813), Irish landowner